Song Su-ran (born 7 September 1990) is a South Korean footballer who plays as a defender for Hwacheon KSPO and the South Korea national team. She participated at the 2015 FIFA Women's World Cup.

International goals
Scores and results list South Korea's goal tally first.

Honours

International
 Asian Games Bronze medal: 2014

References

External links

Song Su-ran at the Korea Women's Football Federation (KWFF)
Song Su-ran at the Korea Football Association (KFA)

1990 births
Living people
South Korean women's footballers
South Korea women's international footballers
2015 FIFA Women's World Cup players
WK League players
Women's association football defenders
Asian Games medalists in football
Footballers at the 2014 Asian Games
Asian Games bronze medalists for South Korea
Medalists at the 2014 Asian Games